Maharani Gautama Bai Holkar [Tai Sahib] was one of the queens of Malhar Rao Holkar III, Maharaja of Indore. After the death of her husband in 1833, she and her mother-in-law Krishna Bai Holkar adopted Marthand Rao Holkar, the son of Bapu Rao, a member of the Holkar family  and then, under popular and military pressure, Hari Rao Holkar to succeed him.

References

See also

 Holkar

1859 deaths
Holkar
Year of birth unknown